Babu Muhammad Rahim Mengal is a Pakistani politician who is sitting member-elect of the Provincial Assembly of the Balochistan and previously served as Minister of PDMA and Tourism Balochistan from 2008-2013.

References

Living people
Politicians from Balochistan, Pakistan
Balochistan National Party (Mengal) MPAs (Balochistan)
Year of birth missing (living people)